SAS: Secure Tomorrow is a tactical first-person shooter video game for Microsoft Windows, developed and published by Polish company City Interactive in 2008. The game utilizes Jupiter EX engine.

Storyline
The player is in command of two SAS units, the main goal of which is to secure the British government from terrorist threat. Meanwhile, a notorious criminal and leader of a terrorist group, escapes with his rescuers from a high security prison. The SAS team is on their toes, and in hot pursuit, to bring him and other terrorists to justice. The SAS team is chasing the fugitives in London, Iceland, and finally in an underground nuclear reactor, and rescuing hostages on the way.

Reception
The game received middling reviews from such gaming sites as: IGN, who gave the game a score of 6.0 and quoted that the game is too easy, because it lacks variety of levels (12 in total).

References

2008 video games
Windows games
Windows-only games
Video games about the Special Air Service
Video games developed in Poland
Video games set in Iceland
Video games set in London
LithTech games
Tactical shooter video games
CI Games games
Multiplayer and single-player video games